"Jumpin' Jive" (also known as "(Hep-Hep!) The Jumpin' Jive") is a famous jazz/swing composition, written by Cab Calloway, Frank Froeba, and Jack Palmer. Originally recorded on 17 July 1939, on Vocalion Records, it sold over a million copies and reached #2 on the Pop chart. Calloway performs the song with his orchestra and the Nicholas Brothers in the 1943 musical film Stormy Weather.

Joe Jackson version

"Jumpin' Jive" was covered by new wave artist Joe Jackson (under the band name Joe Jackson's Jumpin' Jive) on his 1981 album of the same name. The album, originally conceived as "a few pub gigs for a laugh," also featured other jump-blues tracks, including Calloway's "We the Cats (Shall Hep Ya)."

After its release on Jumpin' Jive, Jackson's version was later released as a single, where it charted at #43 in Britain.

Charts

Other covers
It has been recorded notably by The Andrews Sisters, Glenn Miller, and Big Bad Voodoo Daddy.

References

External links
 "Jumpin' Jive" at AllMusic.com

Joe Jackson (musician) songs
1939 songs
1939 singles
Cab Calloway songs
Songs written by Jack Palmer (composer)
Vocalion Records singles
A&M Records singles